Sally McNeil (born September 30, 1960) is an American former professional bodybuilder, who was convicted for the murder of her husband Ray McNeil, a Mr. Olympia competitor.

Early life and education
McNeil was born Sally Dempsey in Allentown, Pennsylvania and describes her upbringing as tough, including exposure to violence so frequently that she had thought it to be commonplace in every home. Sally's father, Richard Dale Dempsey, was a raging alcoholic who was frequently abusive to her mother. Her mother remarried when Sally was 3 years old, and they had two daughters, Judy and Jill, who were Sally’s half sisters, according to the Killer Sally documentary.

McNeil attended Dieruff High School in Allentown, where she was on the school's swimming and diving and track and field teams. She enrolled at East Stroudsburg State College (now East Stroudsburg University of Pennsylvania) with aspirations of becoming a gym teacher. After three and a half years in college, however, she ran out of money to fund her education and dropped out.

Military career and marriages
Like her brother and her uncle before her, McNeil served in the United States Marine Corps at Camp Pendleton. She rose to the rank of Sergeant.

First marriage to Anthony Lowden
McNeil met her first husband, Anthony Lowden, at Parris Island while in the Marines, and were married for four years and had three children together: Shantina, John, and a third child. Sally described Anthony as abusive towards the end of their marriage

As she was being transferred to Camp Pendleton, McNeil filed for divorce from Anthony, winning custody of their two oldest children in the process. During their divorce, the third child was put up for adoption.

She won the U.S. Armed Services Physique Championship twice in the late 1980s.

In 1990, Sally was demoted from her position as a sergeant for a continuously poor behavioral record, including anger issues, violence, and lashing out at others. Her behavioral record also resulted in her being discharged from the military.

Second marriage to Ray McNeil
McNeil started bodybuilding during her service at Camp Pendleton, where a friend introduced her to Ray McNeil, another competitive bodybuilder, in June 1987. They dated for about two months before getting married. Three days later, Ray began abusing both Sally and her two children. Sally was choked and punched by Ray. The family settled in Oceanside, California.

When she was discharged from the military, Sally began a career wrestling men on video for $300 an hour, earning her the moniker 'Killer Sally.' She made enough money to enable Ray to leave the Marines and concentrate on his own bodybuilding career. Ray started using steroids, which Sally blamed for his violent behavior. Sally would even go to Tijuana, Mexico with her children to buy steroids for Ray. Sally would admit she was not proud of this and considered this to be ‘bad parenting’

During this time, Ray won the heavyweight and overall titles in both the 1991 NPC California Championships and the 1991 IFBB North American Championships, and competed in the 1993 Mr. Olympia competition, placing 15th. He also began participating in professional wrestling and did stand-up comedy, performing his material in free shows at The Comedy Club in La Jolla, San Diego.

According to his friend, Dwayne "DJ" Jeffers, Ray got into an altercation with another man one night whilst working as a bouncer at a nightclub and ended up sticking his fingers through his eyes. Shantina, Sally’s daughter, spoke about the same night to verify this, as she recalled seeing Ray coming home covered in blood and how he told her he had to do what he did because the others were trying to kill him.

Ray had been dating another woman at the time and had decided to leave Sally for her. According to DJ, Ray actually planned to spend Valentine’s Day in 1995 with the other woman, not his wife. Ray apparently even told DJ he would tell Sally about ending their relationship. DJ warned him about the shotgun in their house, saying she might shoot him. But he said Ray only laughed it off.

Violent behaviour
McNeil was arrested in 1990, for brandishing a firearm at Lowden and smashing the windows of his vehicle with a metal bar. She had been arrested previously for assaulting a mailman who had slapped her son John after he had a fight with his son.

McNeil attacked one of Ray’s lovers at a bodybuilding show, pinning her to the floor and hitting her repeatedly. This resulted in the National Physique Committee suspending her for a year. It is thought she also physically took her anger out on her husband, pulling a gun on him for the first time before being pepper-sprayed by police officers.

In 1993, Sally was confronted by a club bouncer for dancing on the tables. Drunk and not wanting to do what he told her, Sally kicked him in the face three times. When police arrived, she threatened to kill them.

Murder of Ray McNeil
On February 14, 1995, Sally called 9-1-1, telling them: "I just shot my husband because he just beat me up." Earlier in the night, Ray was on a date with Marianne Myers, a fellow member of Golds Gym, instead of Sally on Valentine’s Day. Sally was about to go out and find where Ray was, but he turned up after 9:15pm. Sally claimed and maintains that she shot Ray in self-defense when he, spurred by roid rage, began choking her after she accused him of adultery. The police transcript reads that Ray, "slapped her, pushed her down on the floor, and started choking her. McNeil squirmed away, ran into the bedroom, and took her sawed-off shotgun out of its case in the closet." Sally then shot Ray twice: once in the abdomen and once in the jaw.

Trial and conviction
Evidence arose during Sally's trial that questioned the validity of the story she had given, including her body language during the initial police interview, the trajectory of the rounds fired into Ray (one of which must have been fired while he was on the floor), and the blood splatter on their living room lamp. In addition, no DNA of Sally’s was found on Ray, which eliminated any forensic evidence to back up her story.

In 1996, she was convicted of second degree murder and sentenced to 19 years to life.

Imprisonment and appeals
After numerous appeals on a variety of grounds, including improper jury instructions, McNeil's conviction was initially overturned by the U.S. 9th Circuit Court of Appeals which resulted in the granting of a writ of habeas corpus. The State of California then appealed to the US Supreme Court which reversed the 9th Circuit's ruling and remanded the case back to that same venue for further action. Relying on information and instructions from the SCOTUS opinion, the 9th Circuit reconsidered the matter and on March 29, 2005, issued their opinion ruling in favor of the State and reinstating McNeil's original conviction.

McNeil served her sentence at the Central California Women's Facility in Chowchilla, California.

Release
Her parole was granted by the California Department of Corrections and Rehabilitation on May 29, 2020.

Post-prison personal life
Following her release, McNeil married Norfleet Stewart, who she met through her Veterans Transition Center support group. She currently resides in Northern California.

Bodybuilding

In media
In October 2022, Netflix released a three-part docuseries, Killer Sally, covering the case and its aftermath. It was directed by Nanette Burstein, whose previous credits include On the Ropes (1999) and Hillary (2020).

References

External links

Killer Sally on Netflix
Killer Sally trailer on YouTube

1960 births
Living people
21st-century American women
American bodybuilders
American female murderers
American people convicted of murder
American sportspeople convicted of crimes
Female United States Marine Corps personnel
Louis E. Dieruff High School alumni
Mariticides
People convicted of murder by California
United States Marine Corps non-commissioned officers